Jane MacArthur FRAS is a British planetary scientist and science writer based in Leicester.

Early life and education 

Jane MacArthur went to City of Norwich School, Norfolk, before studying Mathematics at the University of Nottingham. She completed an MSc in Planetary Sciences at University College London after taking distance learning courses in Planetary Geology, Exoplanets and Galaxies at Liverpool John Moores University. She completed several workshops and summer schools relating to geology and exoplanets, developing a considerable public profile through science festivals and media appearances.

Research 
MacArthur studies martian meteorites and Stardust comet samples with John Bridges, Michael Branney and Steve Baker at the University of Leicester. Her research includes fieldwork at impact craters, volcanoes and volcanic fields.

MacArthur is a member of the UKSEDS (UK Students for Exploration & Development of Space) Advisory Board and British Interplanetary Society (BIS) Education & Outreach committee. In 2014 she was elected for the council of the Royal Astronomical Society.

Public engagement 
In 2011, MacArthur was invited to watch the launch of the final NASA STS-135 mission from the Kennedy Space Centre. In 2012 she was appointed National Point of Contact for the Space Generation Advisory Council. She has been involved in several public engagement activities, from "I'm a Scientist, Get Me Out of Here" to NASA Socials. In 2016, she was the only UK winner of the European Southern Observatory’s social media competition. In 2017 she contributed to BlueDot festival with the University of Manchester and the UK Space Conference.

MacArthur writes for the science magazine Popular Astronomy. She is on the steering board of the educational fund RAS 200, which looks to award £1,000,000 to projects that support astronomy and geophysics.

References

1986 births
Alumni of the University of Nottingham
Alumni of University College London
Academics of the University of Leicester
British science writers
British physicists
Living people